James Sharp (12 February 1870 – unknown) was a Scottish footballer who played in the Football League for Darwen and Preston North End, and in the Scottish Football League for Vale of Leven (also appearing for them on the losing side in the 1890 Scottish Cup Final).

His nephew Buchanan Sharp was also a footballer.

References

1870 births
Scottish footballers
People from Bonhill
Footballers from West Dunbartonshire
English Football League players
Scottish Football League players
Vale of Leven F.C. players
Preston North End F.C. players
Darwen F.C. players
Association football forwards
Association football wing halves
Year of death missing